The 1953 St. Louis Cardinals season was the team's 72nd season in St. Louis, Missouri and the 62nd season in the National League. The Cardinals went 83–71 during the season and finished in a tie for 3rd place with the Philadelphia Phillies in the National League.

Prior to the start of the season, August A. Busch, Jr. of Anheuser-Busch bought the team from Fred Saigh.  That started a reign that would last until March 1996, when William DeWitt, Jr., Drew Baur and Fred Hanser bought the club.   Realizing the Cardinals now had more resources than he could possibly match, Bill Veeck, owner of the St. Louis Browns decided to search for another city to which to move the Browns.  As a first step, he sold Sportsman's Park to the Cardinals.  He would have probably had to sell the park in any case; the park had fallen into disrepair over the years, and the city had threatened to have it condemned.  With the Browns' declining revenues – despite collecting rent from the Cardinals – Veeck could not afford to bring it up to code.  Busch heavily renovated the 44-year-old park and renamed it Busch Stadium.  Within a year, Veeck also sold the Browns to Jerold Hoffberger and Clarence Miles, and the new owners moved them to Baltimore as the Orioles.

Offseason 
 December 3, 1952: Grant Dunlap was purchased by the Cardinals from the Shreveport Sports.

Regular season

Season standings

Record vs. opponents

Notable transactions 
 May 18, 1953: Billy Johnson was released by the Cardinals.
 May 23, 1953: Jackie Collum was traded by the Cardinals to the Cincinnati Reds for Eddie Erautt.
 June 14, 1953: Hal Rice was traded by the Cardinals to the Pittsburgh Pirates for Pete Castiglione.

Roster

Player stats

Batting

Starters by position 
Note: Pos = Position; G = Games played; AB = At bats; H = Hits; Avg. = Batting average; HR = Home runs; RBI = Runs batted in

Other batters 
Note: G = Games played; AB = At bats; H = Hits; Avg. = Batting average; HR = Home runs; RBI = Runs batted in

Pitching

Starting pitchers 
Note: G = Games pitched; IP = Innings pitched; W = Wins; L = Losses; ERA = Earned run average; SO = Strikeouts

Other pitchers 
Note: G = Games pitched; IP = Innings pitched; W = Wins; L = Losses; ERA = Earned run average; SO = Strikeouts

Relief pitchers 
Note: G = Games pitched; W = Wins; L = Losses; SV = Saves; ERA = Earned run average; SO = Strikeouts

Farm system 

LEAGUE CHAMPIONS: Dothan, Hazlehurst-Baxley, Paducah

References

External links 
 1953 St. Louis Cardinals at Baseball Reference
 1953 St. Louis Cardinals team page at www.baseball-almanac.com

St. Louis Cardinals seasons
Saint Louis Cardinals season
1953 in sports in Missouri